The 2002 MTV Video Music Awards aired live on August 29, 2002, honoring the best music videos from June 9, 2001, to May 31, 2002. The show was hosted by Jimmy Fallon at the Radio City Music Hall in New York City. During the show, Michael Jackson accepted a birthday statue in hands of Britney Spears, which he believed to be an "Artist of the Millennium Award" due to a misunderstanding. Performers included Eminem, who won four awards including Video of the Year, and Axl Rose with a new lineup of Guns N' Roses. The show also saw the debut solo performance from Justin Timberlake, performing his soon to be hit single "Like I Love You" alongside rap duo Clipse.  TLC members Tionne "T-Boz" Watkins and Rozonda "Chili" Thomas appeared, paying tribute to their fallen member Lisa "Left Eye" Lopes, who died in a car accident in Honduras on April 25, 2002, four months before the event.

Background
MTV announced on May 1 that the 2002 Video Music Awards would be held on August 29 at Radio City Music Hall. The departure from the ceremony's traditional September scheduling was made to avoid a conflict with the first anniversary of the September 11 attacks, and the VMAs have alternated between August and September dates since this ceremony. Nominees were announced on July 22, and Jimmy Fallon was announced as host on the same date. The ceremony broadcast was preceded by the 2002 MTV Video Music Awards Opening Act. Hosted by Kurt Loder and SuChin Pak with reports from John Norris, Iann Robinson, Sway, Gideon Yago, and Nick Zano, the broadcast featured red carpet interviews, pre-taped reports on The Hives versus The Vines and P. Diddy, and performances from Avril Lavigne and Ludacris. The broadcast marked the first live awards ceremony to be filmed in the 24p digital format as MTV prepared to broadcast in high-definition for future ceremonies.

Performances

Presenters

Pre-show
 Sway Calloway and Iann Robinson – announced the winners of the professional categories, Best Video from a Film, and Best Dance Video

Main show
 James Gandolfini – introduced Bruce Springsteen and the E Street Band
 James Brown – made a special appearance during Jimmy Fallon's opening skit and introduced Britney Spears
 Britney Spears – introduced Michael Jackson and presented Best Pop Video with him
 Jennifer Love Hewitt – introduced Pink
 Enrique Iglesias and Kylie Minogue – presented Best R&B Video
 The Osbournes – appeared in a series of vignettes introducing the Viewer's Choice award voting procedures
 Mary-Kate and Ashley Olsen – presented Breakthrough Video
 B2K – introduced Ja Rule, Ashanti and Nas
 Anthony Kiedis and Brittany Murphy – presented the MTV2 Award
 Johnny Knoxville, Bam Margera and Steve-O – presented Best Rap Video
 Linkin Park (Mike Shinoda and Chester Bennington) and P.O.D. (Sonny Sandoval and "Wuv") – presented Best Hip-Hop Video
 Kate Hudson and Heath Ledger – introduced Shakira
 Simon Cowell, Paula Abdul, Randy Jackson, Kelly Clarkson and Justin Guarini – presented Best New Artist in a Video
 David Lee Roth and Sammy Hagar – presented Best Rock Video
 Mike Myers – introduced Eminem
 Carson Daly – presented MTV's "Lisa Lopes AIDS Scholarship," introduced TLC and later presented Best Group Video
 TLC (Tionne Watkins and Rozonda Thomas) – paid tribute to their deceased groupmate Lisa Lopes
 Run-D.M.C. – introduced P. Diddy
 Lisa Marie Presley and Avril Lavigne – presented Best Female Video
 Jennifer Lopez – introduced New York City Mayor Rudy Giuliani and introduced Sheryl Crow with him
 Triumph the Insult Comic Dog – "interviewed" Moby and Eminem
 Christina Aguilera – presented Best Male Video
 Kirsten Dunst (with host Jimmy Fallon) – introduced The Hives and The Vines
 Brandy – introduced Justin Timberlake
 'N Sync (Justin Timberlake, JC Chasez, Chris Kirkpatrick and Joey Fatone) – introduced the winners of MTV's "Last Fans Standing" contest and presented Viewer's Choice with them
 Nelly and Kelly Osbourne – presented Video of the Year

Winners and nominees
Winners are in bold text.

See also
2002 MTV Europe Music Awards

References

External links
 Official MTV site

2002
MTV Video Music Awards
MTV Video Music Awards
MTV Video Music Awards